The PDVAL affair, also known as the Pudreval affair, refers to the finding of tons of rotten food supplies in mid-2010 imported during Hugo Chávez's government through subsidies of state-owned enterprise PDVAL. Due to the scandal, PDVAL started being administrated by the Vicepresidency of Venezuela and afterwards by the Alimentation Ministry. Three former managers were detained, but were released afterwards and two of them had their positions restored. In July 2010, official estimates stated that 130,000 tons of food supplies were affected, while the political opposition informed of 170,000 tons. As of 2012, any advances in the investigations by the National Assembly were unknown.

The most accepted explanation of the loss of food supplies is the organization of PDVAL, because the food network allegedly imported supplies faster than what it could distribute them. The opposition considers the affair as a corrupt case and spokespeople have assured that the public officials deliberately imported more food that could be distributed to embezzle funds through the import of subsidized supplies.

See also 
Local Committees for Supply and Production (CLAP)

Notes

References 

2010 in Venezuela
Bolivarian Revolution
Corruption in Venezuela
Food and drink in Venezuela
Political scandals in Venezuela